Östorp and Ådran (sometimes Ådran and Östorp) is a bimunicipal locality situated in Haninge Municipality and Huddinge Municipality in Stockholm County, Sweden with 244 inhabitants in 2010.

References 

Populated places in Haninge Municipality
Populated places in Huddinge Municipality